Gimme Dat may refer to:
"Gimmie Dat", a 2010 song by Ciara
"Gimme Dat", a 2013 song by Ice Prince
"Gimme Dat", a song by Chingy from Hate It or Love It
"Gimme' Dat", a song by Kreesha Turner
"Gimme Dat", a song by P-Square from Danger
"Gimme Dat Ding", a song by The Pipkins